The National Rescue Party is a political party in Costa Rica.

The party first contested general elections in 1998, but received only 0.7% of the vote and failed to win a seat. In 2002 they received only 0.3% of the vote, whilst José Hine García, the party's presidential candidate, finished last with 0.01%. In the 2006 elections support for the party did not allow it to win a single seat. It did not contest the 2010 elections.

References

Defunct political parties in Costa Rica